Princess Elisabeth Antarctica, located on Utsteinen Nunatak in Queen Maud Land, is a Belgian scientific polar research station, which went into service on 15 February 2009.

History
The station, designed, built and operated by the International Polar Foundation, is the first polar base that combines eco-friendly construction materials, clean and efficient energy use, optimization of the station's energy consumption and clever waste-management techniques.

Testing phase in Brussels and building construction in Antarctica was coordinated by Belgian main contractor BESIX.
 
The station can withstand such strong winds through its aerodynamic shape and its foundation anchoring of several metres deep into the permafrost. Philippe Samyn, a Belgian architect, was involved in designing the shell and underlying structure. The upper deck of the building is the actual station and looks over the ridge edge. The lower deck contains a garage for snowcat vehicles and other utilities.

The Princess Elisabeth base is the only zero-emission base on the Antarctic, and runs on solar and wind energy through the use of a micro smart grid, which has lead-acid batteries as well as backup generators. The station is connected to nine wind turbines that stretch out along the Utsteinen ridge. As of February 2023, the station also houses the only electric exploration vehicle in the Antarctic, the Venturi Antarctica, which has been in-service since December 2021. The station houses up to 16 scientists at a time.

The station is named after Princess Elisabeth, Duchess of Brabant, the eldest daughter of King Philippe of Belgium.

During the Covid pandemic that started in 2020, 11 of 30 of the base's personnel contracted the disease in December 2021 despite having been vaccinated. The first case was a person who had arrived on 7 December, and was found to have covid on 14 December. The cases were mild, and  none were expected to be evacuated on a flight scheduled for 12 January 2022.

Ownership dispute 
There was a protracted dispute between the government of Belgium and the explorer Alain Hubert as to which party controls the base. The Belgian Government has alleged financial mismanagement by the base's private operators, the International Polar Foundation. Disputes over ownership and control of the base have led to a reduction in scientific research being undertaken at the base. As per L'Echo, the head of the Belgian Federal Science Policy Office, René Delcourt, has stated that no Belgian scientists would be sent to the station in 2017.

The dispute was resolved on 9 June 2017 as a judgement ruled by the Belgian Council of State. Publicly announced on 30 June 2017 as the "Pax Antarctica", the settlement between the International Polar Foundation and the Belgian government includes the Belgian government fully owning the base, the International Polar Foundation receiving contracts to operate the base for the next six years, and a cessation of all legal proceedings. Research work resumed in November 2017, with 24 scientists from twelve countries expected at the base.

See also
Belgian Antarctic Program
 List of Antarctic research stations
 List of Antarctic field camps
 List of airports in Antarctica

References

External links

 Belgian Antarctic Research Station - Princess Elisabeth Station
 International Polar Foundation
 Belgian Polar Platform
 The Princess Elisabeth Polar Station: a case study on Constructalia
 Zero-Emissions Station A slideshow about the Princess Elisabeth Station, Allianz Knowledge, July 2008
 COMNAP Antarctic Facilities
 COMNAP Antarctic Facilities Map
 The Pricess Elisabeth Station at Philippe Samyn and Partners

Princess Ragnhild Coast
Sustainable buildings and structures
Outposts of Queen Maud Land
Belgium and the Antarctic
2009 establishments in Antarctica